Henry Vernon (16 December 1828 – 19 February 1855) was an English cricketer who played first-class cricket for Cambridge University, the Marylebone Cricket Club (MCC) and other amateur teams between 1850 and 1854. His birthplace is not known, but he died at Tixover, Rutland.

He was the eldest son of Henry Charles Vernon and grandson of Lt Gen Henry Charles Edward Vernon. Vernon's family owned Hilton Hall in Staffordshire. He was educated at Harrow School and at Trinity College, Cambridge.

He was in the Harrow cricket eleven for five years from 1845 to 1849 as a middle-order batsman (sometimes an opener) and a bowler – he was 20 at the time of his fifth Eton v Harrow match. Neither his batting nor his bowling style is known. He made his first-class cricket debut while still at school by appearing in a match for the Gentlemen of England against a Gentlemen of Kent team in August 1848. He played regularly for Cambridge University from 1850 to 1852, appearing three times in the University Match against Oxford University and captaining the side in his final year. That 1852 University Match provided him with his best first-class bowling figures: he took three wickets, though the full bowling analysis has not survived, and his personal success was insufficient to prevent a crushing innings defeat for his Cambridge side. His best batting had come earlier in a match for Cambridge University against the MCC, when he made 59, his only half-century. From the end of the university term in 1850, he played for a variety of other amateur teams, rarely making much impact, and continued to do so after he left university: he played in the North v South annual match twice, and four times in Gentlemen v Players fixtures. He also appeared four times for teams calling themselves "England" which, though of no recognised international status, often contained the best cricketers of the day.

Vernon graduated from Cambridge University with a Bachelor of Arts degree in 1853. He does not appear to have followed any profession, and he died barely two years later at Tixover Hall in Rutland, the home of a Harrow contemporary (and very occasional cricketer), Charles Ormston Eaton, from what was termed "congestion of the brain". In some newspapers, the notice of Vernon's death at Eaton's house ran adjacent to a different notice about the marriage of Eaton's sister in Rome, two weeks earlier, both notices contriving to mention both Eaton and Tixover Hall.

References

External links

1828 births
1855 deaths
English cricketers
Cambridge University cricketers
Marylebone Cricket Club cricketers
Gentlemen cricketers
Gentlemen of England cricketers
Non-international England cricketers
North v South cricketers
People educated at Harrow School
Alumni of Trinity College, Cambridge
Gentlemen of Marylebone Cricket Club cricketers
All-England Eleven cricketers
Over 30s v Under 30s cricketers
Gentlemen of the South cricketers
Neurological disease deaths in England